Count Antoni Norbert Potocki hr. Pilawa (1780–1850) was a Polish nobleman (szlachcic).

Son of Józef Makary Potocki and Princess Ludwika Lubomirska, daughter of Prince Stanisław Lubomirski.

Antoni was owner of Monastyryska (Monasterzyska) estates. He became senator–castellan and Brigadier General of the Polish Army.

Marriage and issue
Antoni married Countess Róża Potocka on August 30, 1799 in Tulczyn and had three children:

 Włodzimierz Stanisław Potocki (1800–1820)
 Róża Potocka (1802–1862), married to Count Andrzej Artur Zamoyski
 Przemysław Potocki (1805–1847), married to Princess Teresa Sapieha

With his second wife Izabella Jelska hr. Pielesz, he had four children:

 Cycylia Potocka (1822–1893), unmarried
 Aniela Potocka (born 1825), unmarried 
 Amelia Potocka (1831–1859), unmarried 
 Maria Potocka (died 1855), married to Włodzimierz Siemiątkowski hr. Jastrzębiec

Bibliography
 Polski Słownik Biograficzny t. 27 s. 792

References

1780 births
1850 deaths
Counts of Poland
Polish generals
Antoni Potocki (1780-1850)
Recipients of the Order of Saint Stanislaus (Congress Poland)
People from Monastyryska
Privy Councillor (Russian Empire)